Paulino Angelino de Souza (31 May 1953 – 2 August 2007), known as just Ângelo, was a Brazilian footballer who played in the 1972 Olympic Games.

Career
Born in Onça de Pitangui, Ângelo began playing football as a midfielder with local side Clube Atlético Mineiro. In a 10-year span he made 238 official appearances for the club, winning the Campeonato Mineiro three times, the Taça Minas Gerais once and the Campeonato Brasileiro Série A once. He was part of the 1971 Campeonato Brasileiro Série A championship-winning side, and the 1977 Campeonato Brasileiro Série A runners'-up side.

Personal
Ângelo died of a heart attack at age 54.

References

External links
 
 

1953 births
2007 deaths
Brazilian footballers
Associação Atlética Ponte Preta players
Clube Atlético Mineiro players
Esporte Clube Democrata players
Esporte Clube São Bento players
Fluminense FC players
Guarani FC players
Marília Atlético Clube players
Nacional Futebol Clube players
Santa Cruz Futebol Clube players
Sport Club do Recife players
Footballers at the 1972 Summer Olympics
Olympic footballers of Brazil
1975 Copa América players
Association football midfielders